Sheyenne Lake National Wildlife Refuge is an  National Wildlife Refuge (NWR) in the U.S. state of North Dakota. Sheyenne Lake NWR is an easement refuge and is on privately owned land, but the landowners and U.S. Government work cooperatively to protect the resources. The U.S. Fish and Wildlife Service oversees Sheyenne NWR from their offices at Audubon National Wildlife Refuge.

References

External links
 Audubon National Wildlife Refuge: About the Complex
 Oh Ranger: Sheyenne Lake National Wildlife Refuge

Protected areas of Sheridan County, North Dakota
National Wildlife Refuges in North Dakota
Easement refuges in North Dakota